Strimko is a logic number puzzle invented by the Grabarchuk Family in 2008. It is based on the idea of Latin squares described by the Swiss mathematician and physicist Leonhard Euler in the 18th century.

All Strimko puzzles are solvable with pure logic; no special knowledge is required. Strimko uses only three basic elements: rows, columns, and streams. All elements have an equal number of cells, and the goal is to make each row, column, and stream contain the whole set of specified numbers. Cells in the grid are organized into several streams of equal length, which often run diagonally and even branching. Such mechanics create entangled patterns resulting in interesting challenges and unusual logic.

Strimko challenges were handcrafted by Helen, Tanya, and Peter Grabarchuk, and hundreds of original Strimko puzzles were published in various forms and platforms: Web, iOS, PC/Mac, Kindle, paperback.

Overview
The goal of the game is to fully fill in the given grid (3x3, 4x4, 5x5 ...) with missing numbers observing three simple rules.

Rule #1
Each row must contain different numbers.

Rule #2
Each column must contain different numbers.

Rule #3
Each stream must contain different numbers.

Reception
The game received positive reviews from GameZebo (3.5/5), Jay Is Games (4/5) and Softpedia (4.8/5).

References

External links

The Grabarchuk Family
Puzzlium Inc.
 Braintonik Games's Strimko page

2010 video games
Sudoku
Windows games
IOS games
MacOS games
Video games developed in Canada
Browser games
Browser-based game websites
Casual games
Puzzle video games